{{DISPLAYTITLE:C29H52O}}
The molecular formula C29H52O (molar mass: 416.72 g/mol, exact mass: 416.4018 u) may refer to:

 24-Ethyl coprostanol
 Stigmastanol (sitostanol)
 Poriferastanol

Molecular formulas